National regulatory authorities have granted full or emergency use authorizations for 40 COVID-19 vaccines.

Ten vaccines have been approved for emergency or full use by at least one stringent regulatory authority recognized by the World Health Organization (WHO): Pfizer–BioNTech, Oxford–AstraZeneca, Sinopharm BIBP, Moderna, Janssen, CoronaVac, Covaxin, Novavax, Convidecia, and Sanofi–GSK. Seven others are under assessment by the WHO: Sputnik V, Sinopharm WIBP, Abdala, Zifivax, Corbevax, COVIran Barekat, and SCB-2019.

Of the 40 vaccines, 16 have a full or emergency authorization in only one country, 12 in ten or fewer countries, and 12 in more than ten countries.

Note that in some countries, vaccines may be authorized solely for travel purposes. They may not be approved for the general population. For example, the CoronaVac, Covishield, BBIBP-CorV and Covaxin vaccines are not part of Australia's national vaccination program; however, they are recognized for the purpose of travel to Australia.

Overview maps

Oxford–AstraZeneca 

The Oxford–AstraZeneca COVID-19 vaccine, sold under the brand names Vaxzevria and Covishield, is a viral vector vaccine produced by the British University of Oxford, British-Swedish company AstraZeneca, and the Coalition for Epidemic Preparedness Innovations. Finland, Denmark, and Norway suspended the use of the Oxford–AstraZeneca vaccine due to a small number of reports of a rare blood clot disorder. Slovakia suspended its use after the death of a predisposed recipient. South Africa suspended its use because a small trial found only minimal protection against mild to moderate disease from the locally predominant Beta variant. Japan approved the vaccine for emergency use in May 2021, but did not plan to use them immediately because of rare cases of a blood clotting disorder reported overseas. Later, Japan started to use the vaccine for people aged 40 or over to mitigate the surge of the Delta variant in August. Finland ceased use of the vaccine as the last batch expired on 30 November 2021. Until then it was only offered for those aged 65 or more due to extremely rare coagulation disorders among younger recipients of the vaccine. After this Finland will not procure more of the vaccine. The AstraZeneca vaccine is the most widely accepted internationally, and the most popular in terms of total inoculated worldwide, over 1.3 billion. The AstraZeneca vaccine is administered in more countries than any other vaccine.

Full (5)
 Australia
 Brazil
 Canada
 India
 Israel

 Austria
 Belgium
 Bulgaria
 Croatia
 Cyprus
 Czech Republic
 Denmark
 Estonia
 Finland
 France
 Germany
 Greece
 Hungary
 Iceland
 Ireland
 Italy
 Latvia
 Liechtenstein
 Lithuania
 Luxembourg
 Malta
 Netherlands
 Norway
 Poland
 Portugal
 Romania
 Slovakia
 Slovenia
 Spain
 Sweden

Emergency (170)
 Afghanistan
 Albania
 Algeria
 Andorra
 Angola
 Argentina
 Armenia
 Azerbaijan
 Bahrain
 Bangladesh
 Benin
 Bhutan
 Bolivia
 Bosnia and Herzegovina
 Botswana
 Brunei
 Burkina Faso
 Cambodia
 Cameroon
 Cape Verde
 Central African Republic
 Chile
 Colombia
 Comoros
 Congo-Brazzaville
 Congo-Kinshasa
 Costa Rica
 Djibouti
 Dominican Republic
 East Timor
 Ecuador
 Egypt
 El Salvador
 Eswatini
 Ethiopia
 Fiji
 Gambia
 Georgia
 Ghana
 Guatemala
 Guinea-Bissau
 Guinea
 Honduras
 Indonesia
 Iran
 Iraq
 Ivory Coast
 Japan
 Jordan
 Kenya
 Kiribati
 Kosovo
 Kuwait
 Kyrgyzstan
 Laos
 Lebanon
 Lesotho
 Liberia
 Libya
 Madagascar
 Malawi
 Malaysia
 Maldives
 Mali
 Mauritania
 Mauritius
 Mexico
 Micronesia
 Moldova
 Mongolia
 Montenegro
 Morocco
 Mozambique
 Myanmar
 Namibia
 Nauru
 Nepal
 New Zealand
 Nicaragua
 Niger
 Nigeria
 North Macedonia
 Oman
 Pakistan
 Palestine
 Panama
 Papua New Guinea
 Paraguay
 Peru
 Philippines
 Qatar
 Rwanda
 Samoa
 São Tomé and Príncipe
 Saudi Arabia
 Senegal
 Serbia
 Seychelles
 Sierra Leone
 Singapore (restricted)
 Solomon Islands
 Somalia
 South Korea
 South Sudan
 Sri Lanka
 Sudan
 Syria
 Taiwan
 Tajikistan
 Thailand
 Togo
 Tonga
 Tunisia
 Turkmenistan
 Tuvalu
 Uganda
 Ukraine
 United Arab Emirates
 United Kingdom
 Uruguay
 Uzbekistan
 Vanuatu
 Vietnam
 Yemen
 Zambia
 Zimbabwe

 Antigua and Barbuda
 Bahamas
 Barbados
 Belize
 Dominica
 Grenada
 Guyana
 Haiti
 Jamaica
 Saint Kitts and Nevis
 Saint Lucia
 Saint Vincent and the Grenadines
 Suriname
 Trinidad and Tobago
 Anguilla
 Aruba
 British Virgin Islands
 Bermuda
 Caribbean Netherlands
 Cayman Islands
 Curaçao
 Montserrat
 Sint Maarten
 Turks and Caicos Islands
Non-country entities
 Cook Islands
 Falkland Islands
 French Polynesia
 Greenland
 Guadeloupe
 Guernsey
 Isle of Man
 Jersey
 Northern Cyprus
 Pitcairn
 Saint Helena, Ascension and Tristan da Cunha
 Wallis and Futuna
 World Health Organization
Travel-only
 Hong Kong
 Switzerland
 United States

 Austria
 Belgium
 Bulgaria
 Croatia
 Cyprus
 Czech Republic
 Denmark
 Estonia
 Finland
 France
 Germany
 Greece
 Hungary
 Iceland
 Ireland
 Italy
 Latvia
 Liechtenstein
 Lithuania
 Luxembourg
 Malta
 Netherlands
 Norway
 Poland
 Portugal
 Romania
 Slovakia
 Slovenia
 Spain
 Sweden

Pfizer–BioNTech 

The Pfizer–BioNTech COVID-19 vaccine, sold under the brand name Comirnaty, is an mRNA vaccine produced by the German company BioNTech and the American company Pfizer. In Hong Kong, Macau, and Taiwan, Comirnaty is distributed by Fosun Pharma.

Original 
Full (40)
 Australia
 Brazil
 Canada
 Marshall Islands
 Micronesia
 New Zealand
 Palau
 Saudi Arabia
 Switzerland
 United States

 Austria
 Belgium
 Bulgaria
 Croatia
 Cyprus
 Czech Republic
 Denmark
 Estonia
 Finland
 France
 Germany
 Greece
 Hungary
 Iceland
 Ireland
 Italy
 Latvia
 Liechtenstein
 Lithuania
 Luxembourg
 Malta
 Netherlands
 Norway
 Poland
 Portugal
 Romania
 Slovakia
 Slovenia
 Spain
 Sweden
Non-country entities
 Hong Kong
Emergency (145)
 Afghanistan
 Albania
 Algeria
 Andorra
 Argentina
 Armenia
 Azerbaijan
 Bahrain
 Bangladesh
 Benin
 Bhutan
 Bolivia
 Bosnia and Herzegovina
 Botswana
 Brunei
 Cambodia
 Cameroon
 Cape Verde
 Chile
 China (For German citizens)
 Colombia
 Congo-Kinshasa
 Costa Rica
 Djibouti
 Dominican Republic
 East Timor
 Ecuador
 Egypt
 El Salvador
 Eswatini
 Fiji
 Gabon
 Georgia
 Ghana
 Guatemala
 Guinea
 Honduras
 Indonesia
 Iraq
 Israel
 Ivory Coast
 Japan
 Jordan
 Kazakhstan
 Kenya
 Kosovo
 Kuwait
 Kyrgyzstan
 Laos
 Lebanon
 Libya
 Malawi
 Malaysia
 Maldives
 Mexico
 Moldova
 Monaco
 Mongolia
 Montenegro
 Morocco
 Namibia
 Nepal
 Nicaragua
 Nigeria
 North Macedonia
 Oman
 Pakistan
 Palestine
 Panama
 Papua New Guinea
 Paraguay
 Peru
 Philippines
 Qatar
 Rwanda
 Samoa
 San Marino
 Serbia
 Singapore
 Somalia
 South Africa
 South Korea
 Sri Lanka
 Sudan
 Syria
 Taiwan
 Tajikistan
 Tanzania
 Thailand
 Tonga
 Tunisia
 Turkey
 Uganda
 Ukraine
 United Arab Emirates
 United Kingdom
 Uruguay
 Uzbekistan
 Vatican City
 Vietnam
 Yemen
 Zambia

 Antigua and Barbuda
 Bahamas
 Barbados
 Belize
 Dominica
 Grenada
 Guyana
 Haiti
 Jamaica
 Saint Kitts and Nevis
 Saint Lucia
 Saint Vincent and the Grenadines
 Suriname
 Trinidad and Tobago
 Anguilla
 Aruba
 British Virgin Islands
 Bermuda
 Caribbean Netherlands
 Cayman Islands
 Curaçao
 Montserrat
 Sint Maarten
 Turks and Caicos Islands

Non-country entities
 American Samoa
 Cook Islands
 Faroe Islands
 French Polynesia
 Gibraltar
 Greenland
 Guadeloupe
 Guam
 Guernsey
 Isle of Man
 Jersey
 Macau
 Martinique
 New Caledonia
 Niue
 Northern Cyprus
 Northern Mariana Islands
 Puerto Rico
 Tokelau
 World Health Organization

Bivalent original–BA.1 
 Japan

 Austria
 Belgium
 Bulgaria
 Croatia
 Cyprus
 Czech Republic
 Denmark
 Estonia
 Finland
 France
 Germany
 Greece
 Hungary
 Iceland
 Ireland
 Italy
 Latvia
 Liechtenstein
 Lithuania
 Luxembourg
 Malta
 Netherlands
 Norway
 Poland
 Portugal
 Romania
 Slovakia
 Slovenia
 Spain
 Sweden
Non-country entities
 World Health Organization

Bivalent original–BA.4/5 

 Canadahttps://covid-vaccine.canada.ca/info/regulatory-decision-summary-detail.html?linkID=RDS01006
 China (For German citizens)
 United States

 Austria
 Belgium
 Bulgaria
 Croatia
 Cyprus
 Czech Republic
 Denmark
 Estonia
 Finland
 France
 Germany
 Greece
 Hungary
 Iceland
 Ireland
 Italy
 Latvia
 Liechtenstein
 Lithuania
 Luxembourg
 Malta
 Netherlands
 Norway
 Poland
 Portugal
 Romania
 Slovakia
 Slovenia
 Spain
 Sweden
Non-country entities
Hong Kong
Macau
 World Health Organization

Janssen 

The Janssen COVID-19 vaccine is a viral vector vaccine produced by Janssen Pharmaceutica (a subsidiary of Johnson & Johnson) and Beth Israel Deaconess Medical Center. It is also known as Johnson & Johnson COVID-19 Vaccine and as COVID-19 Vaccine Janssen. Three countries, Denmark, Finland, and Norway, discontinued the use of the Janssen vaccine in favor of other available vaccines due to a possible link between the vaccine and a rare blood clot disorder. The use of the Janssen adenovirus vector vaccine began in Finland in October 2021. It is only offered for those aged 65 and over because of a very rare risk of thrombosis in younger age groups.

Full (3)
 Australia (not used)
 Canada
 Switzerland

Emergency (133)
 Afghanistan
 Andorra
 Argentina
 Bahamas
 Bahrain
 Bangladesh
 Benin
 Bolivia
 Botswana
 Brazil
 Brunei
 Burkina Faso
 Cambodia
 Cameroon
 Central African Republic
 Chile
 Colombia
 Congo-Kinshasa
 Djibouti
 Egypt
 Eswatini
 Ethiopia
 Gabon
 Ghana
 Guinea
 Honduras
 India
 Indonesia
 Iran
 Iraq
 Ivory Coast
 Jordan
 Kenya
 Kuwait
 Laos
 Lebanon
 Lesotho
 Liberia
 Libya
 Madagascar
 Malawi
 Malaysia
 Maldives
 Mali
 Marshall Islands
 Mauritania
 Mexico
 Micronesia
 Moldova
 Monaco
 Morocco
 Mozambique
 Namibia
 Nepal
 New Zealand
 Nicaragua
 Nigeria
 Oman
 Pakistan
 Palau
 Palestine
 Papua New Guinea
 Peru
 Philippines
 Qatar
 Rwanda
 Saudi Arabia
 Senegal
 Singapore (restricted)
 Somalia
 South Africa
 South Korea
 South Sudan
 Sudan
 Syria
 Taiwan (not used)
 Tanzania
 Thailand
 Tunisia
 Uganda
 Ukraine
 United Arab Emirates
 United Kingdom
 United States
 Vanuatu
 Vietnam
 Yemen
 Zambia
 Zimbabwe

 Austria
 Belgium
 Bulgaria
 Croatia
 Cyprus
 Czech Republic
 Denmark
 Estonia
 Finland
 France
 Germany
 Greece
 Hungary
 Iceland
 Ireland
 Italy
 Latvia
 Liechtenstein
 Lithuania
 Luxembourg
 Malta
 Netherlands
 Norway
 Poland
 Portugal
 Romania
 Slovakia
 Slovenia
 Spain
 Sweden

 Antigua and Barbuda
 Bahamas
 Barbados
 Belize
 Dominica
 Grenada
 Guyana
 Haiti
 Jamaica
 Saint Kitts and Nevis
 Saint Lucia
 Saint Vincent and the Grenadines
 Suriname
 Trinidad and Tobago
 Anguilla
 Aruba
 British Virgin Islands
 Bermuda
 Caribbean Netherlands
 Cayman Islands
 Curaçao
 Montserrat
 Sint Maarten
 Turks and Caicos Islands

Non-country entities
 American Samoa
 French Polynesia
 Greenland
 Guam
 New Caledonia
 Northern Cyprus
 Northern Mariana Islands
 Puerto Rico
 Africa Regulatory Taskforce
 World Health Organization
Travel-only
 Hong Kong
 Japan
 Turkey

Moderna 

The Moderna COVID-19 vaccine, also known as Spikevax, is an mRNA vaccine produced by the American company Moderna, the U.S. National Institute of Allergy and Infectious Diseases, the U.S. Biomedical Advanced Research and Development Authority, and the Coalition for Epidemic Preparedness Innovations. The Moderna vaccine is not offered for men under 30 years of age in Finland as a precaution to reduce a very rare risk of myocarditis.

Original 
Full (35)
 Australia
 Canada
 Switzerland
 United Kingdom
 United States

 Austria
 Belgium
 Bulgaria
 Croatia
 Cyprus
 Czech Republic
 Denmark
 Estonia
 Finland
 France
 Germany
 Greece
 Hungary
 Iceland
 Ireland
 Italy
 Latvia
 Liechtenstein
 Lithuania
 Luxembourg
 Malta
 Netherlands
 Norway
 Poland
 Portugal
 Romania
 Slovakia
 Slovenia
 Spain
 Sweden

Emergency (116)
 Andorra
 Argentina
 Armenia
 Bahrain
 Bangladesh
 Bhutan
 Botswana
 Bolivia
 Brazil
 Brunei
 Cape Verde
 Chile
 Colombia
 Congo-Brazzaville
 Congo-Kinshasa
 Djibouti
 Egypt
 El Salvador
 Fiji
 Ghana
 Guatemala
 Honduras
 India
 Indonesia
 Iran
 Iraq
 Israel
 Japan
 Jordan
 Kenya
 Kuwait
 Kyrgyzstan
 Lebanon
 Libya
 Malawi
 Malaysia
 Maldives
 Marshall Islands
 Mexico
 Micronesia
 Moldova
 Monaco
 Mongolia
 Morocco
 Nepal
 Nigeria
 Oman
 Pakistan
 Palau
 Palestine
 Paraguay
 Peru
 Philippines
 Qatar
 Rwanda
 Saudi Arabia
 Serbia
 Singapore
 South Korea
 Sri Lanka
 Sudan
 Syria
 Taiwan
 Tajikistan
 Thailand
 Tunisia
 Uganda
 Ukraine
 United Arab Emirates
 Uzbekistan
 Vietnam
 Yemen

 Antigua and Barbuda
 Bahamas
 Barbados
 Belize
 Dominica
 Grenada
 Guyana
 Haiti
 Jamaica
 Saint Kitts and Nevis
 Saint Lucia
 Saint Vincent and the Grenadines
 Suriname
 Trinidad and Tobago
 Anguilla
 Aruba
 British Virgin Islands
 Bermuda
 Caribbean Netherlands
 Cayman Islands
 Curaçao
 Montserrat
 Sint Maarten
 Turks and Caicos Islands

Non-country entities
 American Samoa
 Faroe Islands
 Greenland
 Guadeloupe
 Guam
 Guernsey
 Isle of Man
 Jersey
 Northern Mariana Islands
 Puerto Rico
 Wallis and Futuna
 World Health Organization
Travel-only
 Hong Kong
 New Zealand
 Turkey

Bivalent original–BA.1 

 Australia
 Canada
 Japan
 Singapore
 Switzerland
 Taiwan
 United Kingdom

 Austria
 Belgium
 Bulgaria
 Croatia
 Cyprus
 Czech Republic
 Denmark
 Estonia
 Finland
 France
 Germany
 Greece
 Hungary
 Iceland
 Ireland
 Italy
 Latvia
 Liechtenstein
 Lithuania
 Luxembourg
 Malta
 Netherlands
 Norway
 Poland
 Portugal
 Romania
 Slovakia
 Slovenia
 Spain
 Sweden

Bivalent original–BA.4/5 

 Taiwan
 United States

Sinopharm BIBP 

The Sinopharm BIBP COVID-19 vaccine is an inactivated virus vaccine produced by the China National Pharmaceutical Group (Sinopharm) and its Beijing Institute of Biological Products.

Full (4)
 Bahrain
 China
 Seychelles
 United Arab Emirates

Emergency (111)
 Afghanistan
 Algeria
 Angola
 Argentina
 Armenia
 Bangladesh
 Belarus
 Bhutan
 Bolivia
 Bosnia and Herzegovina
 Brazil
 Brunei
 Burkina Faso
 Burundi
 Cambodia
 Cameroon
 Cape Verde
 Chad
 Comoros
 Congo-Brazzaville
 Cuba
 Djibouti
 Dominican Republic
 Egypt
 El Salvador
 Equatorial Guinea
 Ethiopia
 Gabon
 Gambia
 Georgia
 Guinea-Bissau
 Guinea
 Hungary
 Indonesia
 Iran
 Iraq
 Ivory Coast
 Jordan
 Kazakhstan
 Kenya
 Kiribati
 Kuwait
 Kyrgyzstan
 Laos
 Lebanon
 Lesotho
 Libya
 Madagascar
 Malawi
 Malaysia
 Maldives
 Mauritania
 Mauritius
 Mexico
 Moldova
 Mongolia
 Montenegro
 Morocco
 Mozambique
 Myanmar
 Namibia
 Nepal
 Nicaragua
 Niger
 Nigeria
 North Korea
 North Macedonia
 Oman
 Pakistan
 Palestine
 Papua New Guinea
 Paraguay
 Peru
 Philippines
 Qatar
 Rwanda
 Senegal
 Serbia
 Sierra Leone
 Singapore
 Solomon Islands
 Somalia
 South Sudan
 Sri Lanka
 Sudan
 Syria
 Tanzania
 Thailand
 Tunisia
 Turkmenistan
 Vanuatu
 Venezuela
 Vietnam
 Yemen
 Zambia
 Zimbabwe

 Antigua and Barbuda
 Bahamas
 Barbados
 Belize
 Dominica
 Grenada
 Guyana
 Haiti
 Jamaica
 Saint Kitts and Nevis
 Saint Lucia
 Saint Vincent and the Grenadines
 Suriname
 Trinidad and Tobago
 Anguilla
 Aruba
 British Virgin Islands
 Bermuda
 Caribbean Netherlands
 Cayman Islands
 Curaçao
 Montserrat
 Sint Maarten
 Turks and Caicos Islands

Non-country entities
 Macau
 World Health Organization

Travel-only

 Andorra
 Australia
 Austria (only for entry)
 Bulgaria
 Canada
 Chile
 Costa Rica
 Croatia
 Cyprus
 Czech Republic (only for Hungarian citizens and EU nationals vaccinated in Hungary)
 Estonia (only if approved in a person's country of origin)
 Finland
 Greece
 Grenada
 Hong Kong
 Iceland
 Ireland
 Japan
 Latvia
 Liechtenstein
 New Zealand
 Oman
 Panama
 Portugal (only in Madeira)
 Qatar
 Saudi Arabia (for short visits, Hajj and Umrah only)
 Slovakia
 Slovenia
 South Korea
 Spain
 St. Kitts and Nevis
 St. Lucia
 St. Vincent and the Grenadines
 Sweden
 Switzerland
 The Netherlands
 Turkey
 Ukraine
 United Kingdom
 United States
 Uruguay (only if approved in a person's country of origin)

Sputnik V 

The Sputnik V COVID-19 vaccine is a viral vector vaccine produced by the Russian Gamaleya Research Institute of Epidemiology and Microbiology.
Full (3)
 Russia
 Turkmenistan
 Uzbekistan

Emergency (76)
 Albania
 Algeria
 Angola
 Antigua and Barbuda
 Argentina
 Armenia
 Azerbaijan
 Bahrain
 Bangladesh
 Belarus
 Bolivia
 Bosnia and Herzegovina
 Brazil (restricted)
 Cambodia
 Cameroon
 Chile
 Congo-Brazzaville
 Djibouti
 Ecuador
 Egypt
 Gabon
 Gambia
 Ghana
 Guatemala
 Guinea
 Guyana
 Honduras
 Hungary
 India
 Indonesia
 Iran
 Iraq
 Ivory Coast
 Jordan
 Kazakhstan
 Kenya
 Kyrgyzstan
 Laos
 Lebanon
 Libya
 Maldives
 Mali
 Mauritius
 Mexico
 Moldova
 Mongolia
 Montenegro
 Morocco
 Myanmar
 Namibia
 Nepal
 Nicaragua
 Nigeria
 North Macedonia
 Oman
 Pakistan
 Palestine
 Panama
 Paraguay
 Peru
 Philippines
 Rwanda
 Saint Vincent and the Grenadines
 San Marino
 Serbia
 Seychelles
 Sri Lanka
 Syria
 Tajikistan
Tanzania
 Tunisia
 Turkey (limited use)
 United Arab Emirates
 Venezuela
 Vietnam
 Zimbabwe
Non-country entities
 Abkhazia
 South Ossetia

Expired
 Slovakia
Rejected
 South Africa
Travel-only
 Australia
 Cyprus
 Estonia
 Greece
 Hong Kong
 Israel
 Malaysia
 New Zealand
 Saudi Arabia
 Slovenia
 St. Lucia
 Thailand

CoronaVac 

The CoronaVac COVID-19 vaccine is an inactivated virus vaccine produced by the Chinese company Sinovac Biotech.
Full (1)
 China

Non-country entities
 Hong Kong

Emergency (71)
 Afghanistan
 Albania
 Algeria
 Argentina
 Armenia
 Azerbaijan
 Bangladesh
 Benin
 Bolivia
 Bosnia and Herzegovina
 Botswana
 Brazil
 Cambodia
 Chile
 Colombia
 Djibouti
 Dominica
 Dominican Republic
 East Timor
 Ecuador
 Egypt
 El Salvador
 Equatorial Guinea
 Fiji
 Gabon
 Georgia
 Guinea
 Guyana
 Hungary
 Indonesia
 Iraq
 Jordan
 Kazakhstan
 Kuwait
 Laos
 Lebanon
 Libya
 Malawi
 Malaysia
 Maldives
 Mexico
 Moldova
 Morocco
 Myanmar
 Nepal
 North Macedonia
 Oman
 Pakistan
 Palestine
 Panama
 Paraguay
 Philippines
 Qatar
 Rwanda
 Saint Vincent and the Grenadines
 Saudi Arabia
 Singapore
 Somalia
 South Africa
 Sri Lanka
 Sudan
 Syria
 Tajikistan
 Tanzania
 Thailand
 Togo
 Trinidad and Tobago
 Tunisia
 Turkey
 Turkmenistan
 Uganda
 Ukraine
 United Arab Emirates
 Uruguay
 Uzbekistan
 Venezuela
 Yemen
 Zimbabwe

Non-country entities
 Northern Cyprus
 World Health Organization

Travel-only

 Andorra
 Australia
 Austria (only for entry)
 Canada
 Costa Rica
 Croatia
 Cyprus
 Estonia (only if approved in a person's country of origin)
 Finland
 Greece
 Grenada
 Iceland
 Ireland
 Japan
 Liechtenstein
 Norway
 New Zealand
 Norway
 Palau
 Panama
 Portugal (only in Madeira)
 Slovakia
 Slovenia
 South Korea
 Spain
 St. Kitts and Nevis
 St. Lucia
 St. Vincent and the Grenadines
 Sweden
 Switzerland
 The Netherlands
 Ukraine
 United Arab Emirates
 United Kingdom
 United States
 Vietnam

Novavax 

The Novavax COVID-19 vaccine, sold under the brand names Nuvaxovid and Covovax, is a subunit COVID-19 vaccine candidate developed by Novavax and the Coalition for Epidemic Preparedness Innovations.

Full (4)
 Australia
 Canada
 Japan
 South Korea

Emergency (57)
 Bangladesh
 India
 Indonesia
 Monaco
 New Zealand
 Philippines
 Singapore
 South Africa
 Switzerland
 Thailand
 Taiwan
 United Kingdom
 United States

 Austria
 Belgium
 Bulgaria
 Croatia
 Cyprus
 Czech Republic
 Denmark
 Estonia
 Finland
 France
 Germany
 Greece
 Hungary
 Iceland
 Ireland
 Italy
 Latvia
 Liechtenstein
 Lithuania
 Luxembourg
 Malta
 Netherlands
 Norway
 Poland
 Portugal
 Romania
 Slovakia
 Slovenia
 Spain
 Sweden

 Antigua and Barbuda
 Bahamas
 Barbados
 Belize
 Dominica
 Grenada
 Guyana
 Haiti
 Jamaica
 Saint Kitts and Nevis
 Saint Lucia
 Saint Vincent and the Grenadines
 Suriname
 Trinidad and Tobago
 Anguilla
 Aruba
 British Virgin Islands
 Bermuda
 Caribbean Netherlands
 Cayman Islands
 Curaçao
 Montserrat
 Sint Maarten
 Turks and Caicos Islands

Non-country entities
 World Health Organization

Travel-only
 Hong Kong
 Palau
 Panama
 Switzerland
 Turkey
 United Arab Emirates
 United States

Covaxin 

Covaxin is an inactivated virus vaccine produced by the Indian company Bharat Biotech in collaboration with the Indian Council of Medical Research–National Institute of Virology.

Full (1)
 India

Emergency (50)
 Afghanistan
 Bahrain
 Botswana
 Central African Republic
 Comoros
 Egypt
 Ethiopia
 Guatemala (not used)
 Iran
 Iraq
 Jordan
 Kuwait
 Lebanon
 Libya
 Malaysia
 Mauritius
 Mexico (not used)
 Morocco
 Myanmar
 Nepal
 Nicaragua (not used)
 Oman
 Pakistan
 Paraguay
 Philippines
 Qatar
 Somalia
 Sudan
 Syria
 Tunisia
 United Arab Emirates
 Venezuela (not used)
 Vietnam
 Yemen
 Zimbabwe

 Antigua and Barbuda
 Bahamas
 Barbados
 Belize
 Dominica
 Grenada
 Guyana (not used)
 Haiti
 Jamaica
 Saint Kitts and Nevis
 Saint Lucia
 Saint Vincent and the Grenadines
 Suriname
 Trinidad and Tobago
 Anguilla
 Aruba
 British Virgin Islands
 Bermuda
 Caribbean Netherlands
 Cayman Islands
 Curaçao
 Montserrat
 Sint Maarten
 Turks and Caicos Islands

Non-country entities
 Palestine
 World Health Organization
Travel-only

 Andorra
 Australia
 Austria (only for entry)
 Canada
 Costa Rica
 Croatia
 Cyprus
 Estonia (only if approved in a person's country of origin)
 Finland
 Greece
 Hong Kong
 Iceland
 Ireland
 Japan
 Kyrgyzstan
 Liechtenstein
 Mongolia
 New Zealand
 Norway
 Oman
 Palestine
 Palau
 Panama
 Portugal (only in Madeira)
 Saudi Arabia
 Singapore
 Slovakia
 Slovenia
 South Korea
 Spain
 Sri Lanka
 Sweden
 Switzerland
 Thailand
 The Netherlands
 Turkey
 Ukraine
 United Kingdom
 United States

VLA2001 

VLA2001 is an inactivated vaccine developed by Valneva SE and Dynavax Technologies.

Full (1)
 United Kingdom

Emergency (32)
 Bahrain
 United Arab Emirates

 Austria
 Belgium
 Bulgaria
 Croatia
 Cyprus
 Czech Republic
 Denmark
 Estonia
 Finland
 France
 Germany
 Greece
 Hungary
 Iceland
 Ireland
 Italy
 Latvia
 Liechtenstein
 Lithuania
 Luxembourg
 Malta
 Netherlands
 Norway
 Poland
 Portugal
 Romania
 Slovakia
 Slovenia
 Spain
 Sweden

Travel-only
 Malaysia
 New Zealand
 Turkey

Sanofi–GSK 
The Sanofi–GSK COVID-19 vaccine, sold under the brand name VidPrevtyn Beta, is a subunit vaccine developed by Sanofi Pasteur and GSK plc.  It is based on the SARS-CoV-2 Beta variant.

 (as booster only)
 Austria
 Belgium
 Bulgaria
 Croatia
 Cyprus
 Czech Republic
 Denmark
 Estonia
 Finland
 France
 Germany
 Greece
 Hungary
 Iceland
 Ireland
 Italy
 Latvia
 Liechtenstein
 Lithuania
 Luxembourg
 Malta
 Netherlands
 Norway
 Poland
 Portugal
 Romania
 Slovakia
 Slovenia
 Spain
 Sweden

Sputnik Light 

Sputnik Light is a viral vector vaccine, produced by the Russian Gamaleya Research Institute of Epidemiology and Microbiology. It consists of the first dose of the Sputnik V vaccine, which is based on the Ad26 vector.

Full (0)

Emergency (28)
 Angola
 Argentina
 Armenia
 Bahrain
 Belarus
 Benin
 Cambodia
 Congo-Brazzaville
 Egypt
 Iran
 India
 Kazakhstan
 Kyrgyzstan
 Laos
 Mauritius
 Mongolia
 Nicaragua
 Palestine
 Philippines
 Russia
 Saint Vincent and the Grenadines
 San Marino
 Syria
 Tanzania
 Tunisia
 TurkmenistanТуркменистан зарегистрировал облегченный вариант российской вакцины «Спутник V»
 United Arab Emirates
 Venezuela
Non-country entities
 Abkhazia
 Donbass Region (unofficially)

Travel-only
 Malaysia
 New Zealand
 Turkey

Convidecia 

Convidecia is a viral vector vaccine produced by the Chinese company CanSino Biologics and the Beijing Institute of Biotechnology of the Academy of Military Medical Sciences.

Full (1)
 China

Emergency (9)
 Argentina
 Chile
 Ecuador
 Hungary
 Indonesia
 Malaysia
 Mexico
 Moldova
 Pakistan
Non-country entities
 World Health Organization
Travel-only
 Hong Kong
 Japan
 New Zealand
 Turkey

Sinopharm WIBP 

The Sinopharm WIBP COVID-19 vaccine is an inactivated virus vaccine produced by the China National Pharmaceutical Group (Sinopharm) and its Wuhan Institute of Biological Products.

Full (1)
 China

Emergency (5)
 Armenia
 North Macedonia
 Peru
 Philippines
 United Arab Emirates
 Venezuela

Travel-only
 Hong Kong
 Malaysia
 New Zealand
 Turkey

Abdala 

Abdala is a subunit vaccine developed by the Center for Genetic Engineering and Biotechnology in Cuba.

Full (0)

Emergency (6)
 Cuba
 Mexico
 Nicaragua
 St. Vincent and the Grenadines
 Venezuela
 Vietnam

Travel-only
 Cambodia
 Colombia
 Guyana
 Malaysia
 New Zealand
 St. Lucia
 Turkey
 Uruguay (only if accepted in the country of the person's origin)

EpiVacCorona 

EpiVacCorona is a peptide vaccine produced by the Russian State Research Center of Virology and Biotechnology VECTOR.

Full (1)
 Turkmenistan

Emergency (4)
 Belarus
 Cambodia
 Russia
 Venezuela

Travel-only
 Malaysia
 New Zealand
 Turkey

Zifivax 

Zifivax is a subunit vaccine produced by the Chinese company Anhui Zhifei Longcom Biopharmaceutical.

Full (0)

Emergency (5)
 China
 Colombia
 Indonesia
 Pakistan
 Uzbekistan

Travel-only
 Hong Kong
 Malaysia
 New Zealand
 Turkey

Soberana 02 

Soberana 02, is a conjugate vaccine developed by the Finlay Institute in Cuba.

Full (0)

Emergency (4)
 Cuba
 Iran
 Nicaragua
 Venezuela

Travel-only
 Guyana
 Hungary
 Malaysia
 New Zealand
 Turkey

CoviVac 

CoviVac is an inactivated virus vaccine produced by the Chumakov Centre at the Russian Academy of Sciences.

Full (0)

Emergency (3)
 Belarus
 Cambodia
 Russia
 Travel-only
 Malaysia
 New Zealand
 Turkey

QazCovid-in 

QazCovid-in, also known as QazVac, is an inactivated virus vaccine developed by the Research Institute for Biological Safety Problems in Kazakhstan.
Full (0)

Emergency (2)
 Kazakhstan
 Kyrgyzstan

Travel-only
 Malaysia
 New Zealand
 Turkey

Minhai 

Minhai COVID-19 vaccine, is an inactivated virus vaccine developed by Minhai Biotechnology Co. and Shenzhen Kangtai Biological Products Co. Ltd. in China.
Full (0)

Emergency (2)
 China
 Indonesia

Travel-only
 Hong Kong
 Malaysia
 New Zealand
 Turkey

Medigen 

MVC-COV1901, is a protein subunit vaccine developed by Taiwan's Medigen Vaccine Biologics and Dynavax Technologies.
Full (0)

Emergency (3)
 Eswatini
 Taiwan
 Paraguay

Non-country entities
1. Somaliland

Travel-only
 Belize
 Indonesia
 Malaysia
 New Zealand
 Palau
 Thailand
 Turkey

Corbevax 
Corbevax is a protein subunit vaccine developed by Texas Children's Hospital at the Baylor College of Medicine in Houston, Texas, and licensed to Indian biopharmaceutical firm Biological E. Limited (BioE) for development and production.

Full (0)

Emergency (2)
 India
 Botswana

Travel-only
 Malaysia
 New Zealand
 Turkey

COVIran Barekat 

COVIran Barekat, is an inactivated virus vaccine developed by Shifa Pharmed Industrial Co. in Iran.
Full (0)

Emergency (2)
 Iran
 Nicaragua

Travel-only

 Malaysia
 New Zealand
 Hungary
Turkey

Chinese Academy of Medical Sciences 

Chinese Academy of Medical Sciences COVID-19 vaccine, is an inactivated virus vaccine developed by Chinese Academy of Medical Sciences.
Full (0)

Emergency (1)
 China

Travel-only
 Hong Kong
 New Zealand
 Turkey

ZyCoV-D 
ZyCoV-D, is a DNA plasmid based COVID-19 vaccine developed by the Indian pharmaceutical company Cadila Healthcare with support from the Biotechnology Industry Research Assistance Council.
Full (0)

Emergency (1)
 India

Travel-only
 Malaysia
 New Zealand
 Turkey

FAKHRAVAC 

FAKHRAVAC (or MIVAC), is an inactivated virus vaccine developed in Iran by the Organization of Defensive Innovation and Research, an organization of Iran's Ministry of Defense.
Full (0)

Emergency (1)
 Iran

Travel-only
 Hungary
 Malaysia
 New Zealand
 Turkey

COVAX-19 

COVAX-19, also known as SpikoGen, is a protein subunit vaccine jointly developed by Australian-based company Vaxine and Iran-based company CinnaGen.
Full (0)

Emergency (1)
 Iran

Travel-only
 Hungary
 Malaysia
 New Zealand
 Turkey

Razi Cov Pars 

Razi Cov Pars is a protein subunit vaccine developed by Razi Vaccine and Serum Research Institute.
Full (0)

Emergency (1)
 Iran

Travel-only
 Hungary
 Malaysia
 New Zealand
 Turkey

Turkovac 

Turkovac is an inactivated vaccine developed by Health Institutes of Turkey and Erciyes University.

Full (0)

Emergency (1)
 Turkey

Travel-only
 Malaysia
 New Zealand

Sinopharm CNBG 
Sinopharm CNBG COVID-19 vaccine (NVSI) is a recombinant protein subunit vaccine developed by the National Vaccine & Serum Institute (NVSI, 中生研究院), a subsidiary of China National Biotec Group (CNBG), which in turn is a subsidiary of Sinopharm.

Full (0)

Emergency (1)
 United Arab Emirates

Travel-only
 Malaysia
 Turkey

Soberana Plus 
Soberana Plus is a single-dose of conjugate vaccine developed by the Finlay Institute in Cuba.

Full (0)

Emergency (2)
 Belarus
 Cuba

Travel-only
 Guyana
 Malaysia
 New Zealand
 Turkey

CoVLP
CoVLP is a virus-like particle vaccine grown in an Australian weed, Nicotiana benthamiana. It was developed by Medicago, and is marketed under the name Covifenz.

Full (1)
 Canada

Emergency (0)

Travel-only
 Malaysia
 New Zealand
 Turkey

Noora 
Noora is a protein-based vaccine developed by the Baqiyatallah University of Medical Sciences.

Full (0)

Emergency (1)
 Iran

Travel-only
 Malaysia
 Turkey

SKYCovione 

SKYCovione is a protein subunit vaccine developed by SK Bioscience.

Full (0)

Emergency (1)
 South Korea

Walvax 
Walvax COVID-19 vaccine is an RNA vaccine developed by Walvax Biotechnology, Suzhou Abogen Biosciences, and the PLA Academy of Military Science.

Full (0)

Emergency (1)
 Indonesia

iNCOVACC 

iNCOVACC, also called BBV154 is an adenovirus vector vaccine developed by Bharat Biotech, Precision Virologics, and Washington University School of Medicine.

Full (0)

Emergency (1)
 India

Gemcovac 
Gemcovac, or GEMCOVAC-19, is a self-amplifying mRNA vaccine manufactured by Gennova Biopharmaceuticals.

Full (0)

Emergency (1)
 India

V-01 
V-01 is a protein subunit vaccine developed by Livzon Mabpharm.

Full (0)

Emergency (1)
 China

IndoVac 
IndoVac is a protein subunit vaccine developed by Indonesian pharmaceutical company Bio Farma and Baylor College of Medicine.

Full (0)

Emergency (1)
 Indonesia

Notes

References 

 
Medical research